Axoclinus nigricaudus, known commonly as the Cortez triplefin, is a species of triplefin blenny. It occurs in the eastern Pacific in the western and north-eastern Gulf of California.

References

nigricaudus
Fish described in 1991